Benedict Ernest "Bun" LaPrairie (October 20, 1911 – April 20, 1986) was a professional ice hockey player who played six games in the National Hockey League. Born in Sault Ste. Marie, Michigan, he played for the Chicago Black Hawks.

External links 

Bun LaPrairie's profile at Hockey Reference.com

1911 births
1986 deaths
American men's ice hockey right wingers
Chicago Blackhawks players
Ice hockey players from Michigan
People from Sault Ste. Marie, Michigan